Littoral art is a term used by Canadian artist and writer Bruce Barber to describe art occurring outside of the institutions of the artworld. It is a manifestation of Nicolas Bourriaud's relational aesthetics and is public and community-based, emphasizing the interaction between artists and spectators. The idea derives from Habermas's concept of communicative action.

References

External links
Littoral.org Official site
Sentences on Littoral Art by Bruce Barber

Visual arts theory
Contemporary art